Carposina perileuca is a moth in the family Carposinidae. It was described by Oswald Bertram Lower in 1908. It is found in Australia.

References

Carposinidae
Moths described in 1908
Moths of Australia